Anne Patterson may refer to:

People
 Anne M. Patterson (born 1959), Associate Justice of the New Jersey Supreme Court
 Anne W. Patterson (born 1949), U.S. diplomat, Assistant Secretary of State for Near Eastern Affairs
 Anne Patterson (artist) (born 1960), American designer, painter and sculptor

See also 
 Ann Patterson, American jazz musician
 Anna Patterson, Vice President of Engineering, Artificial Intelligence at Google